In Bloom is a 2013 Georgian drama film directed by Nana Ekvtimishvili and Simon Groß. It is a bildungsroman focused on the friendship between two teenage girls in 1992 after the country’s independence from the Soviet Union. The artistic style is influenced by post-communist Romanian cinema, particularly by cameraman Oleg Mutu, who also worked on 4 Months, 3 Weeks and 2 Days (2007).

The film premiered at the 63rd Berlin International Film Festival, winning the C.I.C.A.E. Prize. It was selected as the Georgian entry for the Best Foreign Language Film at the 86th Academy Awards.

Plot
Natia and Eka are two fourteen year old best friends living in Tbilisi in 1992 after Zviad Gamsakhurdia was deposed and during the Georgian Civil War. Natia is the more vivacious of the two girls, though she has an alcoholic and abusive father. Eka lives with her older sister and mother, while her father is in prison.

Natia has two boys who are interested in her, Kote, and Lado. Lado tells her that he is going to Moscow to visit his uncle but, before he leaves, he gives her a gun with a single bullet. Natia is impressed, believing the gift is Lado's way of taking care of her. After witnessing Eka being bullied on her way home by two boys, Natia forces the gun on her and tells her to use it to intimidate the boys as violence is the only language they understand. However, walking home Eka sees two other boys beating up Kopla, one of the boys that bullies her. Initially intending to ignore the situation, she ends up using the gun to threaten the boys.

Standing in to buy bread some time later, Natia is grabbed by Kote and pulled into a car with his friends. Though Eka tries to help her, she is ultimately unsuccessful. She then turns on the adults who have done nothing to stop Natia's kidnapping and swears at them until one of the men strikes her down. Eka attends Natia's wedding, though she is unhappy for her friend. She gives the gun back to Natia without telling her about her interaction with Kopla.

Natia's initial hesitant happiness in her marriage quickly dissolves. Visited by Eka, she confesses to missing school and being disappointed at living with her husband's family, who are restrictive and don't want her to see her old friends. After they quash plans for a birthday party, Natia ends up sneaking out and spending the day with Eka at her grandmother's house, where she also sees Lado. She is caught by her husband, Kote, who jealously takes her away. Later he gathers up a group of his friends and attacks Lado, culminating in Lado being stabbed and killed. Hearing of the murder, Natia becomes incensed and goes to get the gun, but Eka beats her to her house and keeps it from her long enough to calm her down and prevent her from going to kill Kote. The two end up going to a pond, where Eka throws the gun in the water. Later Eka, who has always refused to visit her father in jail, goes to see him by herself.

Cast
 Lika Babluani as Eka Khizanishvili
 Mariam Bokeria as Natia Zaridze
 Zurab Gogaladze as Kote
 Data Zakareishvili as Lado
 Ana Nijaradze as Ana - Ekas Mother
 Maiko Ninua as Sophiko - Ekas Sister
 Tamar Bukhnikashvili as Natia's Mother
 Temiko Chichinadze as Natia's Father
 Berta Khapava as Natela - Natia's Grandmother
 Sandro Shanshiashvili as Natia's brother
 Endi Dzidzava as Kote's Mother
 Zaza Salia as Kote's Father

Reception 
On review aggregate website Rotten Tomatoes, In Bloom has an approval rating of 90% based on 51 reviews. The website’s critics consensus reads, "A coming-of-age drama entwined with a political statement, In Bloom underscores its well-worn themes with strong performances and palpable real-world tension."
Variety defined it as "an intimate drama about two very young woman destined by differences of class and character for very different fates, and also as a portrait of a fascinating period in the country's social history".

See also
 List of submissions to the 86th Academy Awards for Best Foreign Language Film
 List of Georgian submissions for the Academy Award for Best Foreign Language Film

References

External links
 
 

2013 films
2013 drama films
2010s coming-of-age drama films
2010s female buddy films
2010s Georgian-language films
Drama films from Georgia (country)